The olive-backed quail-dove (Leptotrygon veraguensis) is a species of bird in the family Columbidae. It is found in Colombia, Costa Rica, Ecuador, Nicaragua, and Panama.

Taxonomy and systematics

The olive-backed quail-dove was originally assigned to genus Geotrygon and even earlier to Oreopeleia, but a 2013 paper provided the basis for its present assignment. The American Ornithological Society (AOS) made the change in 2014 and the International Ornithological Committee (IOC) in 2015.

This cladogram shows the position of the olive-backed quail-dove among its closest relatives. It is the only species in its genus.

Description

The adult's forehead is white transitioning to a gray crown and purple hindcrown, nape, and neck. A broad white stripe under the eye has a narrower black stripe under it. The upperparts are dark olive brown or purplish brown. The throat is white and the belly white or buffy white, with reddish buff flanks. The neck, breast, and upperparts have a greenish or purplish iridescence. The sexes are generally alike though the female may sometimes have a buff forehead and crown. Juveniles are similar as well but their feathers have rusty fringes and they have no iridescence.

Distribution and habitat

The olive-backed quail dove is found on the Caribbean slope of far southern Nicaragua, Costa Rica, and Panama, and also the Pacific slope of eastern Panama through western Colombia into northern Ecuador's Esmeraldas Province.

Behavior

Movement

The olive-backed quail-dove is a year round resident in its range. It prefers to walk or run when fleeing from danger, but sometimes flushes for short distances if disturbed.

Feeding

The olive-backed quail-dove forages singly or in pairs, searching the understory or on the ground for seeds, fruits, and small invertebrates.

Breeding

The olive-backed quail-dove's breeding season spans January to July in Costa Rica, and breeding evidence has been recorded between those months elsewhere in its range. The clutch size is two.

Vocalization

The olive-backed quail-dove's song is "a low-pitched short single note 'whOuw', with a rather frog-like quality."

Status

The IUCN has assessed the olive-backed quail-dove as being of Least Concern. It is common in parts of its range, but "[d]eforestation undoubtedly poses a threat to this species."

References

olive-backed quail-dove
Birds of Costa Rica
Birds of Panama
Birds of the Tumbes-Chocó-Magdalena
Birds of Colombia
olive-backed quail-dove
olive-backed quail-dove
Taxonomy articles created by Polbot